The AMR-2 (Anti Material Rifle - 2) is a 12.7mm sniper rifle which was developed in China as an anti-materiel sniper weapon, it was introduced in the early 2000s. Designed and developed by China South Industries Group, the rifle uses bolt-action and a conventional design. The AMR-2 fires a 12.7×108mm cartridge from a 5-round box detachable box magazine fitted directly ahead of the trigger group. The barrel is free-floating and has a large double baffle muzzle brake to mitigate recoil.

References

https://modernfirearms.net/en/sniper-rifles/large-caliber-rifles/china-large-caliber-rifles/amr-2-eng/

12.7×108 mm sniper rifles
Bolt-action rifles
Sniper rifles of the People's Republic of China
Anti-materiel rifles